Francesinha poveira, or simply francesinha, is a fast food dish from Póvoa de Varzim in Portugal. It resembles a hot dog only in shape, but the sandwich is made of linguiça (somewhat similar to a sausage), fiambre (a kind of ham), cheese and mustard in Pão Cacete or Pão de Francesinha, a bread that could be described as midway between a baguette and a hot dog bun.

History
Francesinha poveira is the fast food variety of the francesinha dish that appeared in 1962 in café Guarda-Sol in Passeio Alegre beach square in Póvoa de Varzim. Opened since June 1922, Guarda-Sol is the oldest café-bar of Póvoa, and also the first beach bar in Portugal.

Francesinha poveira is based on the recipe from the original from Porto. As a curiosity, the Portuan variety was created by Povoan Daniel Silva. The Povoan variety appeared from the initiative of the manager, Alberto Moreira, to develop and promote a new distinctive product. To achieve that, he went to Lisbon to find the right person for the job and hired António Carriço, originally from Fundão. António had the initiative to ask the baker that supplied Guarda-Sol to create a kind of bread that should be like a small baguette, soft and tasty. With this idea the "francesinha bread" (pão de francesinha) appeared.

Francesinha sauce

Francesinha is filled with a specific gravy made from with butter, margarine, tomato paste, piri piri and seasonings like white pepper, garlic and paprika, with cognac, brandy, port wine or whisky.

See also
List of sandwiches

References

Portuguese cuisine
Sandwiches
Fast food
Culture in Póvoa de Varzim